Alfred (Al) Mansfeld ( ; 2 March 1912 – 15 March 2004) was an Israeli architect.

Biography

Mansfeld was born in Saint Petersburg, Russia in 1912. While still a child, he moved with his family to Berlin, Germany. He began studying architecture in 1931 at the Technische Hochschule Berlin (Berlin Institute of Technology) but, with the rise of the Nazis to power, he moved in 1933 to Paris, France, where he completed his studies in 1935 at the École Spéciale d'Architecture, as a student of the architect, Auguste Perret, a pioneer of concrete construction. In 1935, he emigrated to Mandate Palestine.

In 1949, Mansfied joined the faculty of the Technion – Israel Institute of Technology, where he taught for over forty years and was Dean of Faculty of Architecture from 1954 to 1956.

Mansfield was the senior partner in the Haifa firm of Mansfeld-Kehat Architects, which he founded in 1935, and of which his son, Michael Mansfeld, is a partner.

He died on 15 March 2004, at his home, designed by him, in central Carmel, Haifa, Israel.

Selected projects
 The interior design of the Israel Museum, jointly with Dora Gad (1965);
 The interior design, together with architect Dora Gad, of the five ships of Zim, Israel's largest shipping company (1955–1975);
 Haifa Auditorium;
 Tikotin Museum of Japanese Art, Haifa;
 The Zim Building, Haifa;
 The Stella Maris neighbourhood in Haifa;
 The Wilfrid Israel Museum on Kibbutz HaZore'a;
 The master plan and the first buildings of the hospital in Nahariya;
 The Mazer Building (now the Feldman Building) on the Givat Ram campus of the Hebrew University of Jerusalem;
 Buildings at Yad Vashem, Jerusalem.

Awards and honours
 In 1966, he won the Israel Prize, in architecture, jointly with Dora Gad, with whom he had designed the interior of Israel Museum.
 In 1969, he received the "Gold Plaquette" for Foreign Architects from the Association of German Architects (BDA - Bund Deutscher Architekten).
 In 1971, he was elected member of the Berlin Academy.
 In 1976, he was awarded the Rechter Prize, for planning the Stella Maris neighbourhood in Haifa.
 In 1983, he was elected an honorary member of the Paris Academy.
 In 2001, he received an honorable mention from the Architects Association.

See also
List of Israel Prize recipients

References

External links

1912 births
2004 deaths
20th-century Russian Jews
Jewish emigrants from Nazi Germany to Mandatory Palestine
Architects in Mandatory Palestine
Israeli architects
Israel Prize in architecture recipients
Members of the Academy of Arts, Berlin
École Spéciale d'Architecture alumni
Emigrants from the Russian Empire to Germany